Statutory rules and orders were the means by which delegated legislation used to be made in the United Kingdom between 1893 and 1974 and in the Irish Free State until 1947.

Statutory rules and orders began with the Rules Publication Act 1893. Prior to that Act there had been no consistent way of publishing orders, regulations or other delegated legislation made by the government.

In Great Britain they were replaced by statutory instruments in 1948 following the passing of the Statutory Instruments Act 1946.

In the independent state of Ireland statutory rules and orders were replaced by statutory instruments defined by Statutory Instruments Act 1947 more broadly than in the 1946 UK act.

In Northern Ireland statutory rules and orders were replaced by statutory rules under the Statutory Rules (Northern Ireland) Order 1979.

See also 
 List of Statutory Rules and Orders of the United Kingdom between 1902 and 1947
 List of Statutory Rules and Orders of Northern Ireland between 1922 and 1974

References 
Statutory Instrument Practice, third edition (June 2003), Cabinet Office and His Majesty's Stationery Office

United Kingdom administrative law